Goudseweg is a town in the Dutch province of South Holland. It is a part of the municipality of Krimpenerwaard, and lies about 5 km southeast of Gouda.

The statistical area "Goudseweg", which also can include the surrounding countryside, has a population of around 50.

Until 2015, Goudseweg was part of Vlist.

References

Populated places in South Holland
Krimpenerwaard